Santagata may refer to:

Santagata (surname), list of people with the surname
22161 Santagata, an asteroid
, a number of ships with this name